Goli (also Romanized as Golī; also known as Gūlī and Kolī) is a village in Balghelu Rural District, in the Central District of Ardabil County, Ardabil Province, Iran. At the 2006 census, its population was 211, in 56 families.

References 

Towns and villages in Ardabil County